Henry Bailey (2 December 1897 – 1965), sometimes known as Harry Bailey, was an English professional footballer who made over 140 appearances as a goalkeeper in the Football League for Exeter City. He also played league football for Luton Town, Brentford and Thames.

Personal life 
Bailey enlisted in the Grenadier Guards in 1913 and served with the regiment during the First World War.

Career statistics

References

1897 births
Sportspeople from Macclesfield
1965 deaths
English footballers
Association football goalkeepers
Millwall F.C. players
Luton Town F.C. players
Exeter City F.C. players
Brentford F.C. players
Thames A.F.C. players
English Football League players
Southern Football League players
British Army personnel of World War I
Grenadier Guards soldiers
Military personnel from Cheshire